General Sir Robert Archibald Cassels,  (15 March 1876 – 23 December 1959) was a British Indian Army officer. He was the father of Field Marshal Sir James Cassels.

Military career
Educated at Sedbergh School and the Royal Military College, Sandhurst, Cassels was commissioned into the Indian Staff Corps as a second lieutenant on 22 January 1896. He received promotion to lieutenant on 22 April 1898, to captain on 22 January 1905 and to major on 22 January 1914.

He went on to serve in the First World War, receiving rapid and successive promotion to temporary lieutenant colonel on 19 January 1916, brevet lieutenant colonel on 3 June 1916, brevet colonel in June 1917, and to temporary brigadier general on 6 August 1917. In November 1917 he was appointed Commander of 11th Indian Cavalry Brigade and took his brigade on a great turning movement up the left bank of the River Tigris, outflanking the Turks and helping to bring the Mesopotamian Campaign to an end. Following the war, he briefly commanded the 18th Indian Division while it was stationed in the Middle East.

Cassels was promoted to major general on 1 January 1919 in the Cavalry in India when he was appointed Commander of Peshawar District. He became Adjutant-General, India in 1928, and was promoted to lieutenant general on 14 April (back-dated to 1 May 1927). He was promoted to general on 15 October 1929 and appointed General Officer Commanding-in-Chief of Northern Command, India in 1930. He was next made Commander-in-Chief, India and a Member of the Executive Council of the Governor-General of India in 1935. He continued in that post into the Second World War and retired in 1941.

Honours
Knight Grand Cross of the Order of the Bath – 3 June 1933 (KCB – 3 June 1927; CB – c.1918)
Knight Grand Commander of the Order of the Star of India – 11 July 1940 (CSI – c.1919)
Distinguished Service Order – c.1919
Officer of the Legion of Honour – 7 June 1919

References

|-
 

|-

1876 births
1959 deaths
Indian Army generals of World War II
Indian Staff Corps officers
Knights Grand Cross of the Order of the Bath
Knights Grand Commander of the Order of the Star of India
Companions of the Distinguished Service Order
Indian Army cavalry generals of World War I
English cricketers
Europeans cricketers
British Indian Army generals
Members of the Council of the Governor General of India
British people in colonial India